Everett Public Schools, officially Everett School District No. 2, is the main public school district for the city of Everett, Washington. In addition to covering most of Everett, the district also serves the city of Mill Creek along with some unincorporated areas of Snohomish County. The district has twenty-seven schools and had an enrollment of 20,948 students during the 2019–20 school year. The current superintendent is Dr. Ian B. Saltzman.

The school district contracts with Durham School Services for most school bus operations; it operates a small fleet for its special education programs.

Schools
Here is a list of the schools in the Everett School District.

High schools
Cascade High School
Everett High School
Henry M. Jackson High School
Sequoia High School
EPS Online High School

Middle schools
Eisenhower Middle School
Evergreen Middle School
Gateway Middle School
Heatherwood Middle School
North Middle School

Elementary schools
Cedar Wood Elementary School
Emerson Elementary School
Forest View Elementary School
Garfield Elementary School
Hawthorne Elementary School
Jackson Elementary School
James Monroe Elementary School
Jefferson Elementary School
Lowell Elementary School
Madison Elementary School
Mill Creek Elementary School
Penny Creek Elementary School
Silver Firs Elementary School
Silver Lake Elementary School
Tambark Creek Elementary School
View Ridge Elementary School
Whittier Elementary School
Woodside Elementary School

Home School Parent Partnership
Port Gardner

References

External links
Everett Public Schools
Everett School District Report Card

School districts in Washington (state)
Education in Everett, Washington
Education in Snohomish County, Washington